The following is a list of antibiotics. The highest division between antibiotics is bactericidal and bacteriostatic. Bactericidals kill bacteria directly, whereas bacteriostatics prevent them from dividing. However, these classifications are based on laboratory behavior. The development of antibiotics has had a profound effect on health in people for many years. Also, for both people and animals have used antibiotics to treat infections and diseases. In practice, both treat a bacterial infection.

By coverage
The following are lists of antibiotics for specific microbial coverage.

MRSA
Antibiotics that cover methicillin-resistant Staphylococcus aureus (MRSA):
 Vancomycin
 Teicoplanin
 Linezolid
 Daptomycin
 Trimethoprim/sulfamethoxazole
 Doxycycline
 Ceftobiprole (5th generation)
 Ceftaroline (5th generation)
 Clindamycin
 Dalbavancin
 Delafloxacin
 Fusidic acid
 Mupirocin (topical)
 Omadacycline
 Oritavancin
 Tedizolid
 Telavancin
 Tigecycline (also covers gram negatives)

Pseudomonas aeruginosa
Antibiotics that cover Pseudomonas aeruginosa:

Certain cephalosporins:
 Ceftazidime (3rd generation)
 Cefepime (4th generation)
 Ceftobiprole (5th generation)
 Ceftolozane/tazobactam
 Ceftazidime/avibactam
 Cefiderocol(siderophore cephalosporin)

Certain Penicillin-class antimicrobials:
 Piperacillin/tazobactam
 Ticarcillin/clavulanic acid

Certain carbapenems and carbapenem-beta-lactamase-inhibitors combinations:
 Meropenem/vaborbactam
 Imipenem/cilastatin/relebactam
 Carbapenems: (meropenem, imipenem/cilastatin - NOT ertapenem)

Others:
 Fluoroquinolones
 Polymyxins: Colistin, Polymyxin B
 Aztreonam (monobactam)
 Aminoglycosides

VRE
Antibiotics that cover vancomycin-resistant Enterococcus (VRE):
 Linezolid
 Streptogramins
 Tigecycline
 Daptomycin

By class
''See also pathogenic bacteria for a list of antibiotics sorted by target bacteria.

Note: (Bs): Bacteriostatic

Antibiotic candidates 

These are antibiotic candidates, and known antibiotics that are not yet mass-produced.

See also 
 Timeline of antibiotics, listed by year of introduction
 Pathogenic bacteria

Notes

References 

Antibiotics